Toadflax is the common name of several related genera of plants in the family Plantaginaceae, including:

 Anarrhinum
 Antirrhinum, also called Snapdragon
 Chaenorhinum, native to Turkey and the Mediterranean
 Cymbalaria
 Linaria
 Misopates
 Nuttallanthus